Košute is a village in southern Croatia located west of Trilj. The population is 1,740 (census 2011).

References

Populated places in Split-Dalmatia County